Mezitli River (Liparis of the antiquity) is a rivulet in Mersin Province, Turkey

The river flows in the mid-southern portion of the Toros Mountains from north to south. Although the river is small it had formed a valley of its own. The villages of Uzunkaş, Turunçlu, Karahacılı and Bozön are in the valley. In his book titled Voyage Dans La Cilicie et Dans Les Montagnes Du Taurus in 1853, the French Orientalist Charles-Victor Langlois wrote that there were brier roses, laurels and grape plants in the valley. But presently the valley is a center of citrus and pomegranate horticulture.

References

Mezitli District
Rivers of Turkey
Rivers of Mersin Province